Presbyterian Day School (PDS) is a Christian private school for boys located at 4025 Poplar Avenue, Memphis, Tennessee, 38111. It is one of the largest elementary schools for boys in the United States, enrolling 600 students in grades from two-years of age through the sixth grade.

Founding
When Dr. Anthony Dick accepted the pastorate of Second Presbyterian Church in the summer of 1947, he expressed his desire that the church provide Christian elementary education with a day school. Dr. Dick followed through with his aspirations and opened a new kindergarten in the fall of 1949 at the intersection of Poplar and Goodlett, where school met Monday through Friday and Sunday school on Sunday. An introductory statement sent to church members stated, "We believe that this field (Christian education) offers a real challenge to us and through the medium of this weekday kindergarten, we are preparing to try to use this opportunity for the greatest good to these children, their homes, and to the highest glory of God." The school would later be named ‘Presbyterian Day School,’ known affectionately from its inception as PDS.

PDS registration was initially opened to church members on June 2, 1949, but was opened to non-members the following day. When the education building, the first of three planned construction units, was dedicated on September 11, 1949, thirty-five children were enrolled in pre-kindergarten and kindergarten.

Accreditation
PDS has been accredited by the Southern Association of Colleges and Schools since 1979. It is a member of the National Association of Independent Schools, Southern Association of Independent Schools, Tennessee Association of Independent School, and the Memphis Association of Independent Schools. Other memberships include the Educational Records Bureau.

Presbyterian Day School (PDS) was recognized in 2015 as an Apple Distinguished School because of its one-to-one laptop program and integration of educational technology using Apple hardware, apps, and content-creation apps.

Campus
PDS is located at 4025 Poplar Avenue. The Henry Edward Russell Building houses 34 classrooms, the 17,000 volume Sumner library, state of the art science lab, Morgan Technology Resource Center, art and music facilities, and administrative offices. The John de Witt Activities Center features a double gymnasium with an elevated indoor track. Spacious athletic fields and playgrounds on campus provide excellent spaces for boys to run and recreate.

Notable alumni
 Paul Tudor Jones, commodity trader
 Frederick W. Smith, founder of FedEx
 Hank Sullivant, musician, frontman for Kuroma, past bassist for The Whigs, touring guitarist for MGMT.
 Sid Evans, Editor, Garden & Gun Magazine
 Tom Hutton, former NFL punter, primarily with the Philadelphia Eagles
 Pitt Hyde, founder of Autozone
 Hampton Sides, Author, Ghost Soldiers
 Dan Schneider, Nickelodeon producer
 Beau Davidson, recording artist, actor, songwriter
 Harry Ford - Actor, star of CBS TV series, CODEBLACK

External links
 Main School Page - http://www.pdsmemphis.org
 About PDS & Its History - http://www.pdsmemphis.org/index.php?option=com_content&task=view&id=4&Itemid=7

References

Private elementary schools in Tennessee